Savaniee Ravindrra, or Savani Ravindra, or Savani Ravindra Ghangurde Dhande  (born 22 July 1989), is a singer in the Marathi music industry.

Schooling 
Savaniee Ravindrra was among the five finalist 2011 IDEA Saregma singers. She is the daughter of Dr. Ravindra Ghangurde and Dr. Vandana Ghangurde who are both singers. 
She did her schooling from Fergusson College, Pune. She has a strong classical background. 
Trained in Classical Vocals by Pandit Pandharinath Kolhapure.
She was trained in ghazal by Ravi Date.

Career 
Along with Pandit Hridaynath Mangeshkar, Savani also performed with renowned singers Suresh Wadkar, Arun Date, Ravindra Sathe, Ravindra Jain, Uttara Kelkar and Shridhar Phadke.
She has sung in albums such as "Aashaye", "Canvas" and "Ajunahi(Marathi)"
She has sung for the music shows Black & White, Ghazal ka safar and gulzar baat pashmine ki.
She has sung in films such as Ajab Lagnachi Gajab Gosht and Kuni Ghar Deta Ka Ghar. One of her Marathi songs, "Tu Mala Mi Tula Gungunu Laglo- Honar Sun Mi Hya Gharchi -Zee Marathi", is a duet with singer "Mangesh Borgaonkar".
She has also sung the title song of popular television serial 'Kamala' aired on E-tv Marathi along with Shrirang Bhave. She was also a backing vocalist for the songs sung in the Marathi movie 'Sairat'.

Awards 
Savani Ravindra was awarded the National Film Award for Best Female Playback Singer in the 67th National Film Awards of India. She received the Aapla Awaj "Nari Shakti Puraskar".

References

External links 

Indian women playback singers
Sa Re Ga Ma Pa participants
Marathi-language singers
Marathi playback singers
Best Female Playback Singer National Film Award winners
1989 births
Living people
People from Ratnagiri
Women musicians from Maharashtra
Singers from Maharashtra
21st-century Indian singers
21st-century Indian women singers